In mathematics, and more specifically in partial differential equations, Duhamel's principle is a general method for obtaining solutions to inhomogeneous linear evolution equations like the heat equation, wave equation, and vibrating plate equation. It is named after Jean-Marie Duhamel who first applied the principle to the inhomogeneous heat equation that models, for instance, the distribution of heat in a thin plate which is heated from beneath. For linear evolution equations without spatial dependency, such as a harmonic oscillator, Duhamel's principle reduces to the method of variation of parameters technique for solving linear inhomogeneous ordinary differential equations. It is also an indispensable tool in the study of nonlinear partial differential equations such as the Navier–Stokes equations and nonlinear Schrödinger equation where one treats the nonlinearity as an inhomogeneity.

The philosophy underlying Duhamel's principle is that it is possible to go from solutions of the Cauchy problem (or initial value problem) to solutions of the inhomogeneous problem.

where g is the initial heat distribution. By contrast, the inhomogeneous problem for the heat equation,

corresponds to adding an external heat energy  at each point. Intuitively, one can think of the inhomogeneous problem as a set of homogeneous problems each starting afresh at a different time slice . By linearity, one can add up (integrate) the resulting solutions through time  and obtain the solution for the inhomogeneous problem. This is the essence of Duhamel's principle.

General considerations
Formally, consider a linear inhomogeneous evolution equation for a function 

where L is a linear differential operator that involves no time derivatives.

Duhamel's principle is, formally, that the solution to this problem is

where  is the solution of the problem

The integrand is the retarded solution , evaluated at time , representing the effect, at the later time , of an infinitesimal force  applied at time .

Duhamel's principle also holds for linear systems (with vector-valued functions ), and this in turn furnishes a generalization to higher t derivatives, such as those appearing in the wave equation (see below). Validity of the principle depends on being able to solve the homogeneous problem in an appropriate function space and that the solution should exhibit reasonable dependence on parameters so that the integral is well-defined.

Examples

Wave equation
The linear wave equation models the displacement  of an idealized dispersionless one-dimensional string, in terms of derivatives with respect to time  and space :

The function , in natural units, represents an external force applied to string at the position .  In order to be a suitable physical model for nature, it should be possible to solve it for any initial state that the string is in, specified by its initial displacement and velocity:

More generally, we should be able to solve the equation with data specified on any  slice:

That is, to get the solution at time  from the solution at time , we must add to it a new (forward) solution of the homogeneous (no external forces) wave equation

with the initial conditions

A solution to this equation is achieved by straightforward integration:

(The expression in parenthesis is just  in the notation of the general method above.) So a solution of the original initial value problem is obtained by starting with a solution to the problem with the same prescribed initial values problem but with zero initial displacement, and adding to that (integrating) the contributions from the added force in the time intervals from T to T+dT:

Constant-coefficient linear ODE
Duhamel's principle is the result that the solution to an inhomogeneous, linear, partial differential equation can be solved by first finding the solution for a step input, and then superposing using Duhamel's integral.
Suppose we have a constant coefficient, -th order inhomogeneous ordinary differential equation.

where

We can reduce this to the solution of a homogeneous ODE using the following method. All steps are done formally, ignoring necessary requirements for the solution to be well defined.

First let G solve

Define , with  being the characteristic function of the interval . Then we have

in the sense of distributions. Therefore

solves the ODE.

Constant-coefficient linear PDE
More generally, suppose we have a constant coefficient inhomogeneous partial differential equation

where

We can reduce this to the solution of a homogeneous ODE using the following method. All steps are done formally, ignoring necessary requirements for the solution to be well defined.

First, taking the Fourier transform in  we have

Now for every  let  solve

Define . We then have

in the sense of distributions. Therefore

solves the PDE (after transforming back to ).

See also
Retarded potential
Propagator
Impulse response
Variation of parameters

References

Wave mechanics
Partial differential equations
Mathematical principles